Riders of Black River is a 1939 American Western film directed by Norman Deming and written by Bennett Cohen. The film stars Charles Starrett, Iris Meredith, Dick Curtis, Stanley Brown, Bob Nolan and Francis Sayles. The film was released on August 23, 1939, by Columbia Pictures.

Plot

Cast          
Charles Starrett as Wade Patterson
Iris Meredith as Linda Holden
Dick Curtis as Blaize Carewe
Stanley Brown as Terry Holden
Bob Nolan as Bob
Francis Sayles as Doc Josh Greene
Edmund Cobb as Colt Foster
Ethan Allen as Joel Matthews
Carl Sepulveda as Rip Salter
Olin Francis as Whit Kane
Maston Williams as Ed Gills 
Forrest Taylor as Dave Patterson

References

External links
 

1939 films
American Western (genre) films
1939 Western (genre) films
Columbia Pictures films
American black-and-white films
1930s English-language films
1930s American films